The Chile women's national football team represents Chile in international women's football. It is administered by the Federación de Fútbol de Chile and is a member of CONMEBOL. Chile were close to qualification for the FIFA Women's World Cup in 1991, 1995 and 2011 and later finally made the Finals for the first time in 2019. Chile is, along with Brazil, one of the two teams to never fail to qualify for the Copa América Femenina. Chile's friendlies are frequently played against Argentina, who is a traditional rival. The team is currently coached by José Letelier and is captained by goalkeeper Christiane Endler.

As well as many South American nations, women's football is somewhat under shadow of men's football. Chile, for qualifying to the 2019 FIFA Women's World Cup in France, marked itself as the fifth nation in the CONMEBOL to have both men's and women's teams qualify for senior FIFA tournaments. By far, Chile is one of only three Spanish-speaking countries to have won a game in the Women's World Cup.

Chile women's national football team qualified for its first Summer Olympic Games in Tokyo 2020.

History
Chile is one of the first participants in the Copa América Femenina, when it did in the inaugural 1991 edition, alongside Brazil and Venezuela. Chile lost 1–6 to the Brazilian hosts and won 1–0 over Venezuela, thus failed to qualify for the 1991 FIFA Women's World Cup. Chile then entered an era of decline in fortunes, only winning third place in 1995 and 2010.

Following the failure to qualify for the 2015 FIFA Women's World Cup, Chile women's team had become inactive for three years, before the team was able to return in May 2017 for a friendly against Peru, won by Chile 12–0. This marked the revival of Chile in women's football fortune, and following the 2018 Copa América Femenina as hosts, Chile rode to eventual second place with fan attendance of Chile's games nearly full, which also confirmed Chile a place in the 2019 FIFA Women's World Cup, the first FIFA Women's World Cup in Chile's women's football history, and was seen with joys among Chilean supporters after its men's counterparts failed to qualify for the 2018 FIFA World Cup and accusations of discrimination based on gender toward female footballers.

Chile was drawn into the group F of the 2019 Women's World Cup, sharing group with two very powerful women's forces, world champions United States and Sweden, alongside Southeast Asian opponent and 2015 edition debutant Thailand. Sitting in a totally too difficult group, Chile nonetheless demonstrated brave performances against Sweden and the United States but could not gain a single point, losing 0–2 to Sweden and 0–3 to the United States respectively, or scoring a single goal. Chile's last match, however, was a crucial meeting against Thailand, whose fighting spirits were even more demoralised following two devastating losses to the United States and Sweden earlier. Chile salvaged with a historic 2–0 triumph over Thailand, but the penalty miss in late minutes by Francisca Lara saw Chile eliminated from the World Cup due to inferior goal differences with Nigeria, which later progressed.

Chile then took part in the 2020 Summer Olympics thanked to beating Cameroon in the playoff, but facing stronger opponents Great Britain, Canada and hosts Japan, the Chileans could not gain even just a draw, though not without putting strong fights as Chile's losses weren't as heavy as expected.

Team image

Nicknames
The Chile women's national football team has been known or nicknamed as "La Roja Femenina (The Feminine Red)".

Home stadium

Chile plays their home matches on the Estadio Nacional Julio Martínez Prádanos.

Sponsors
 Cerveza Cristal
 BCI
 Coca-Cola/Powerade
 Adidas
 Chilevision (TV broadcaster of Chile's qualifying and friendly matches)
 Paramount+/Pluto TV (since 2023)
 Televisión Nacional de Chile (TV broadcaster of Chile's Tokyo 2020 matches)
 DSports (TV broadcaster of Chile's April 2022 friendly matches)

Results and fixtures

The following is a list of match results in the last 12 months, as well as any future matches that have been scheduled.

Legend

2022

2023

Chile Results and Fixtures – Soccerway.com

Head-to-head record

 Counted for the FIFA A-level matches only.

Coaching staff

Current coaching staff

Manager history

As of 15 December 2020

Players

Current squad
The following players have been called up for the friendly match against Argentina and the 2023 FIFA Women's World Cup qualifier against Haiti on 17 and 22 February 2023, respectively.

Caps and goals as of 22 February 2023, after the match against .

Recent call-ups
The following players have been called up in the last 12 months.

INJ Withdrew from the squad due to injury
PRE Preliminary squad
RET Retired from National Team
SUS Withdrew from the squad due to suspension

Notable players
Ada Cruz

Captains

Christiane Endler

Previous squads
FIFA Women's World Cup
2019 FIFA Women's World Cup squad
CONMEBOL Copa América Femenina
2018 Copa América Femenina squad

Records

Players in bold are still active, at least at club level.

Most capped players

Top goalscorers

Honours

Continental
CONMEBOL Copa América Femenina
 Runners-up: (2) 1991, 2018
  Third place: (2) 1995, 2010

Regional
South American Games
 Runners-up: (1) 2014

Other tournaments
Turkish Women's Cup
 Champions: (1) 2020
International Tournament Brazil
 Champions: (1) 2019

Youth teams

Under-15
 Summer Youth Olympics:
 Gold medal: (1) 2010

Competitive record

FIFA Women's World Cup

Olympic Games

CONMEBOL Copa América Femenina

Pan American Games

South American Games

See also

Sport in Chile
Football in Chile
Women's football in Chile
Chile women's national under-20 football team
Chile women's national under-17 football team
Chile men's national football team

References

External links

The official Chile women's national football team website
Chile women's national football team website on ANFP
Chile women's national football team website on TNT Sports

 
South American women's national association football teams